Saduria sibirica  is a benthic isopod crustacean of the family Chaetiliidae. It is widespread in Arctic marine water near the coasts of Siberia.

References

Valvifera
Fauna of the Arctic Ocean
Crustaceans described in 1896